This is a list of Billboard magazine's top popular songs of 1948 according to retail sales.

See also
1948 in music
List of number-one singles of 1948 (U.S.)

References

1948 record charts
Billboard charts